"The Roller" is a single by the English rock band Beady Eye, featured on their 2011 debut album Different Gear, Still Speeding. The song was released as a digital single on 23 January 2011, following the release of a music video on 11 January. The 7" vinyl release is backed with the song "Two of a Kind".

Track listing
All songs written by Liam Gallagher, Gem Archer and Andy Bell.

"The Roller" – 3:37
"Two of a Kind" – 3:01

Music video
The music video for the song was shot in Wilburton, Cambridgeshire in December 2010 in sub–zero temperatures and shows the band playing while a motorcyclist rides the walls around them. It was premiered on Channel 4 on 11 January 2011, and released on YouTube shortly after.

Chart performance
On digital release, the single debuted at number 31. However, it fell to number 68 the following week. It is the band’s only single to reach the UK top 40.

Weekly

Year-end charts

References

2011 singles
Songs written by Liam Gallagher
Songs written by Gem Archer
Song recordings produced by Steve Lillywhite
Songs written by Andy Bell (musician)
Beady Eye songs
2010 songs
Song recordings produced by Liam Gallagher
Song recordings produced by Gem Archer
Song recordings produced by Andy Bell (musician)